Edward Cole Chalfant (born August 14, 1937) was bishop of the Episcopal Diocese of Maine from 1986 to 1996.

Biography
Chalfant was born in Pittsburgh, Pennsylvania in 1937. He is a graduate of Wesleyan University and the Virginia Theological Seminary. He was ordained in 1963 and served parishes in Clearwater, Florida first as Associate rector of Ascension Church and then from 1967, as rector of St John's Church. He was called to Southern Ohio in 1972 to be rector of St. Mark's Church in Columbus, Ohio. He also served as a deputy to General Convention and held numerous diocesan posts.

Bishop
In 1984 he was one of five priests nominated for the post of Coadjutor Bishop of Maine. He was elected in the 4th ballot on April 13, 1984. He succeeded Bishop Wolf in 1986.

Resignation 
In April 1996 it became known that Bishop Chalfant was involved in an extra-marital affair. He resigned his seat as Bishop of Maine on May 6 that same year upon the recommendation of the Presiding Bishop and standing committee of the diocese.

References

External links 
Chalfant of Ohio Elected in Maine
'Betrayal of Trust' Leads to Leave of Absence in Maine

1937 births
Living people
Episcopal bishops of Maine